Skellefteå Airport , is located about 17 km from Skellefteå, Västerbotten, Sweden. Skellefteå Airport is ranked as one of ten largest airports in Sweden in terms of domestic flights.

Airlines and destinations
The following airlines operate regular scheduled and charter flights at Skellefteå Airport:

Statistics

See also
List of the largest airports in the Nordic countries

References

External links
Skellefteå Airport – Official website

Airports in Sweden
Skellefteå
Buildings and structures in Västerbotten County
International airports in Sweden